Gymnobela micraulax is a species of sea snail, a marine gastropod mollusk in the family Raphitomidae.

Description
The length of the shell attains 22 mm, its diameter 7.1 mm.

Distribution
This marine species occurs off the Tanimbar Islands, Indonesia and in the Arafura Sea, at depths between 884 m - 891 m.

References

External links
 MNHN, Paris: holotype
 

micraulax
Gastropods described in 1997